The Hungarian State was a short-lived state that existed for 4 months in the last phase of the Hungarian Revolution of 1848–49.

Constitutional tensions between the Hungarian parliament and Franz Joseph

On 2 December 1848 Ferdinand V of Hungary "abdicated" in favour of his nephew Francis Joseph.
The Hungarian reform laws (April laws) were based on the 12 points that established the fundaments of modern civil and political rights, economic and societal reforms in Kingdom of Hungary. Franz Joseph refused to accept the reforms of the Hungarian April laws. Franz Joseph also arbitrarily "revoked" the laws. This was an unconstitutional deed, because the laws were already signed by his uncle King Ferdinand, and the monarch had no right to revoke parliamentary laws which were already signed. The Habsburg government in Vienna proclaimed a new constitution, the so-called Stadion Constitution on 4 March 1849. The centralist Stadion Constitution provided very strong power for the monarch, and marked the way of neo-absolutism. The new March Constitution of Austria was drafted by the Imperial Diet of Austria, where Hungary had no representation. Austrian legislative bodies like the Imperial Diet traditionally had no power in Hungary. Despite this, the Imperial Diet also tried to abolish the Diet of Hungary (which existed as the supreme legislative power in Hungary since the late 12th century.)
The Austrian Stadion constitution also went against the historical constitution of Hungary, and tried to nullify it too.  The revoke of the Hungarian April Laws and reduction of Hungary's territory and traditional status within the Habsburg Monarchy, prompting a renewal of the Hungarian Revolution. These events represented a clear and obvious existential threat for the Hungarian state.

Diet at Debrecen
On 7 March 1849 an imperial proclamation was issued in the name of the emperor Francis Joseph, according to the new proclamation, the territory of Kingdom of Hungary would be administered by five military districts, while Principality of Transylvania would be reestablished. On 7 December the Diet of Hungary formally refused to acknowledge the title of the new king, "as without the knowledge and consent of the diet no one could sit on the Hungarian throne" and called the nation to arms. From a legal point of view, according to the coronation oath, a crowned Hungarian King can not relinquish the Hungarian throne during his life; if the king is alive and unable do his duty as ruler, a governor (or regent with proper English terminology) had to deputize the royal duties. Constitutionally, Ferdinand remained still the legal king of Hungary. If there is no possibility to inherit the throne automatically due to the death of the predecessor king (as king Ferdinand was still alive), but the monarch wants to relinquish his throne and appoint an other king before his death, technically only one legal solution has remained: the parliament had the power to dethrone the king and elect his successor as the new king of Hungary. Due to the legal and military tensions, the Hungarian parliament did not make that favor for Franz Joseph.
This event gave to the revolt an excuse of legality. Actually, from this time until the collapse of the revolution, Lajos Kossuth (as elected regent-president) became the de facto and de jure ruler of Hungary.

The struggle opened with a series of Austrian successes. Prince Windischgrätz, who had received orders to quell the rebellion, began his advance on 15 December; opened up the way to the capital by the victory at Mór (on 30 December), and on 5 January 1849 the Imperial-Royal Army occupied Pest-Buda, while the Hungarian government and diet retired behind the Tisza and established themselves at Debrecen. A last attempt at reconciliation, made by the more moderate members of the diet in Windischgrätz's camp at Bicske (on 3 January), had foundered on the uncompromising attitude of the Austrian commander, who demanded unconditional submission; whereupon the moderates, including Ferenc Deák and Lajos Batthyány, retired into private life, leaving Kossuth to carry on the struggle with the support of the enthusiastic extremists who constituted the rump of the diet at Debrecen. The question now was: how far the military would subordinate itself to the civil element of the national government. The first symptom of dissonance was a proclamation by the commander of the Upper Danube division, Artúr Görgey, from his camp at Vác (on 5 January) emphasizing the fact that the national defence was purely constitutional, and menacing all who might be led astray from this standpoint by republican aspirations. Immediately after this proclamation Görgey disappeared with his army among the hills of Upper Hungary, and, despite the difficulties of a phenomenally severe winter and the constant pursuit of vastly superior forces, fought his way down to the valley of Hernád – and safety. This masterly winter-campaign first revealed Görgey's military genius, and the discipline of that terrible month of marching and counter-marching had hardened his recruits into veterans whom his country regarded with pride and his country's enemies with respect. Unfortunately his success caused some jealousy in official quarters, and when, in the middle of February 1849, a commander-in-chief was appointed to carry out Kossuth's plan of campaign, that vital appointment was given, not to the man who had made the army what it was, but to a foreigner, a Polish refugee, Count Henrik Dembinski, who, after fighting the bloody and indecisive battle of Kápolna (26–27 February 1849), was forced to retreat. Görgey was immediately appointed his successor, and the new generalissimo led the Honvéds from victory to victory. Ably supported by György Klapka and János Damjanich he pressed forward irresistibly. The battles of Szolnok (on 5 March), Isaszeg (on 6 April), Vác (on 10 April), and Nagysarló (on 19 April) were so many milestones in his triumphal progress. On 21 May 1849, Buda, the Hungarian capital was once more in the hands of the Hungarians.

Meanwhile, the earlier events of the war had so altered the political situation that any idea which the diet at Debrecen had cherished of a compromise with Austria was destroyed. The capture of Pest-Buda had confirmed the Austrian court in its policy of unification, which after the victory of Kápolna they thought it safe to proclaim. On 7 March the diet of Kremsier was dissolved, and immediately afterwards a proclamation was issued in the name of the emperor Francis Joseph establishing a united constitution for the whole empire, of which the Kingdom of Hungary, cut up into half a dozen administrative districts, was henceforth to be little more than the largest of several subject provinces. The news of this manifesto, arriving as it did simultaneously with that of Görgey's successes, destroyed the last vestiges of a desire of the Hungarian revolutionists to compromise, and on 14 April 1849, on the motion of Kossuth, the diet proclaimed the independence of Hungary, declared the House of Habsburg as false and perjured, for ever excluded from the throne, and elected Lajos Kossuth Governor-President of the Hungarian State. This was an execrable blunder in the circumstances, and the results were fatal to the national cause. Neither the government nor the army could accommodate itself to the new situation. From henceforth the military and civil authorities, as represented by Kossuth and Görgey, were hopelessly out of sympathy with each other, and the breach widened until all effective co-operation became impossible.

Meanwhile, the humiliating defeats of the Imperial-Royal Army and the course of events in Hungary had compelled the court of Vienna to accept the assistance which the emperor Nicholas I of Russia had proffered in the loftiest spirit of the Holy Alliance. The Austro-Russian alliance was announced at the beginning of May, and before the end of the month the common plan of campaign had been arranged. The Austrian commander-in-chief, Count Haynau, was to attack Hungary from the west, the Russian, Prince Paskevich, from the north, gradually environing the kingdom, and then advancing to end the business by one decisive blow in the mid-Tisza counties. They had at their disposal 375,000 men, to which the Hungarians could only oppose 160,000. The Hungarians, too, were now more than ever divided among themselves, no plan of campaign had yet been drawn up, no commander-in-chief appointed to replace Görgey, whom Kossuth had deposed. Haynau's first victories (20–28 June) put an end to their indecisions. On 2 July the Hungarian government abandoned Pest and transferred its capital first to Szeged and finally to Arad. The Imperial Russian Army was by this time well on its way to the Tisza, and the terrible girdle which was to throttle the liberties of Hungary was all but completed. Kossuth again appointed as commander-in-chief the brave but inefficient Dembinski, who was utterly routed at Temesvár (on 9 August) by Haynau. This was the last great battle of the War of Independence. The final catastrophe was now unavoidable. On 13 August 1849, Görgey, who had been appointed dictator by the panic-stricken government two days before, surrendered the remnant of his hardly pressed army to the Russian General Theodor von Rüdiger at Világos. The other army corps and all the fortresses followed his example, Fort Monostor in  Komárom, heroically defended by György Klapka, being the last to capitulate (on 27 September). Kossuth and his associates, who had left Arad on 10 August, took refuge in Ottoman territory. A period of harsh repression followed. Lajos Batthyány and about 100 others were executed, several society women were publicly whipped, and the government outlawed public gatherings, theater performances, display of the national colours, and wearing of national costumes and Kossuth-style beards.

See also 
History of Hungary

Notes

References

 This article incorporates public domain material from the Library of Congress Country Studies: 

Hungarian Revolution of 1848
1849 in Hungary
1849 establishments in the Austrian Empire
1849 disestablishments in the Austrian Empire